{{Infobox person
| name               = Vishal Vashishtha
| birth_date         =
| birth_place        =
| nationality        = Indian
| occupation         = Actor
| education          = The Heritage School, Kolkata
| years_active       = 2013–present
| spouse             = 
| known for          = Ek Veer Ki Ardaas...VeeraVish Gangaa  Ishq Mein Marjawan 2 Clutch, Ghar Waapsi| image              = 
| caption = 
}}

Vishal Vashishtha is an Indian actor working in the Hindi television industry.

Life

Vishal Vashishtha was born on 13 February in Kolkata, India. While initially planning on a career as a Chartered Accountant, an interest in acting led him to audition for a career on the Small Screen. Besides English, he is also fluent in Hindi and Bengali. Vishal married his childhood sweetheart, Deepakshi Mishra.

Career

Vashishtha's foray into Hindi television industry was with Sphere Origins's youth drama Crazy Stupid Ishq in 2013 broadcast on Channel V India as 'Ayaan Dixit' alongside Hiba Nawab, Harsh Rajput and Aneri Vajani. The same year, he appeared in an episode of MTV Webbed (Ep.11).

He later starred in Yash A Patnaik's Ek Veer Ki Ardaas...Veera on Star Plus(2013), portraying the character of 'Baldev Singh' opposite Digangana Suryavanshi. His performance gained him the Zee Gold Award for Best Male Actor in a Comic Role. In 2015, he featured as 'Anil' in the fifth episode of Yeh Hai Aashiqui created by Vikas Gupta and broadcast by Bindass. In the final quarter of 2015, Vashishtha joined the cast of &TV's Television Drama Series Gangaa starring as 'Sagar Chaturvedi' opposite Aditi Sharma, for this performance he was nominated for Best Actor at Zee Gold Awards. He exited the series in January 2017.

Vashishtha's next project was rom-com Jaat Ki Jugni, broadcast on Sony Entertainment Television from April to July 2017 wherein he was paired opposite (Madirakshi Mundle). In January 2018, he was cast as the titular protagonist Shaurya Gupta (Kanhaiya) in Jai Kanhaiya Lal Ki on Star Bharat. Vashishtha next signed on to star in the finite series Vish: A Poisonous Story (May 2019) on Colors TV. The show co-starred Debina Bonnerjee, Krip Suri and Sana Makbul.

Reuniting with Patnaik, he essayed the lead antagonist role in the romantic thriller Ishq Mein Marjawan 2 on Colors TV as 'Kabir Sharma'   2020 to March 2021. In March 2021, the show ended on TV and shifted to the digital platform Voot by airing a new season named Ishq Mein Marjawan 2: Naya Safar'' with him reprising his role of Kabir Sharma.

In July 2021, Vashishtha joined the lead cast of Dice Media' s " Clutch "- India first e-sport Web-Series. The first episode streamed on 2 October 2021 and the finale episode streamed on 4 November 2021. The series was received with a good reception on YouTube and got a year end special mention for one of the highest viewed YouTube India web series of 2021.

He started 2022 with the shoot of his new webseries tentatively titled 'Ghar Waapsi' produced by Dice Media. In April and May 2022 a string of his YouTube videos were uploaded by FilterCopy and Pocket Change. His OTT debut 'Ghar Waapsi' premiered on Disney+ Hotstar on 22 July 2022.

Television

Web series

Music video

Short films

Youtube videos

Accolades

References

External links 
 
 

Indian male television actors
Male actors in Hindi television
Indian male soap opera actors
21st-century Indian male actors
Male actors from Kolkata
Male actors from Mumbai
Living people
1992 births
Bhawanipur Education Society College alumni